Actinocymbe is a genus of fungi in the family Chaetothyriaceae.

References

Eurotiomycetes
Eurotiomycetes genera